Marsh Mills, also known as Haley's Mill or Spielman Mill, is a historic home located at Fairplay, Washington County, Maryland, United States. It is a -story, three-bay-wide limestone house. The structure was built about 1850 as a mill, then converted to a creamery in the 1880s. Traces of the millrace are still visible where it exits the south end of the building and passes beneath the road. Also on the property is an American Foursquare–style frame house which may incorporate remnants of the original log house which served as the original miller's dwelling.

Marsh Mills was listed on the National Register of Historic Places in 1996.

References

External links
, including photo from 1975, at Maryland Historical Trust

Houses on the National Register of Historic Places in Maryland
Houses completed in 1850
Houses in Washington County, Maryland
Grinding mills in Maryland
National Register of Historic Places in Washington County, Maryland
Grinding mills on the National Register of Historic Places in Maryland